Adam Hmam (born 11 November 1994) is a Tunisian table tennis player, and is the highest ranked player in Tunisia. He won a bronze medal in the Mixed team event at the 2010 Summer Youth Olympics with the Chinese Gu Yuting.

Career
After winning the African Youth Championship in 2011, Adam Hmam joined the French national team 1 of table tennis in Montpellier.

In 2013, Hmam again won the African Youth Championship.

He successfully qualified for the  2020 Summer Olympics in Tokyo.

References

External links
 

Tunisian male table tennis players
Living people
Table tennis players at the 2010 Summer Youth Olympics
1994 births
Table tennis players at the 2020 Summer Olympics
African Games medalists in table tennis
Olympic table tennis players of Tunisia
21st-century Tunisian people
Competitors at the 2019 African Games
African Games bronze medalists for Tunisia